Vadalur is a municipality in Cuddalore district, Tamil Nadu.

History 
Ramalinga Swamigal, often called Vallalar, established the Sathyagnana Sabhai. He built a temple which is open year-round. Thousands of visitors attend festivals and monthly puja dates at this temple. Vadalur is well connected by rail and road, and it provides transport to major cities like Trichy, Chennai, Tanjore, Puducherry, and Kumbakonam.

Festivals
The Thai Poosam celebration in January is a festival held annually in Vadalur. The Swamigal sang thousands of songs called Thiru Arutppa. The district was named after him for a while. On Thai Poosam, thousands of devotees from all over Tamil Nadu visit the temple. More than 10,000 market stalls are available for at least a week for the pilgrims. Food, water, and fresh juice are available for devotees to purchase.

Demographics
As of the 2011 census, Vadalur had a population of 39,514. Males constitute 51% of the population and females 49%. Vadalur has an average literacy rate of 70%, higher than the national average of 59.5%. The male literacy rate is 78%, and the female literacy rate is 61%. In Vadalur, 11% of the population is under 6 years of age. The literacy level is high because of the private schools and government schools. Vadalur runs a ceramic factory called Neycer which employs many people in the city.

Revenue villages 
 Abatharanapuram
 Parvathipuram
 Serakuppam
 Seerangkuppam

Economy 
Agriculture plays an important role in Vadalur's economy. The SIDCO Industrial Estate creates many job opportunities for the people of Vadalur. NLC's coal loading station is located in Vadalur as well. Small businesses also help in improving Vadalur's economic development.

Transportation

Train 

Trains and timing

Bus 
Buses are available from Vadalur to major cities at all times.
 
 Cuddalore - Trichy (TNSTC)
 Chennai - Kumbakonam (TNSTC & SETC)
 Chennai - Tanjore (TNSTC & SETC)
 Cuddalore - Salem (TNSTC)
 Chidambaram - Salem (TNSTC)
 Puducherry - Tiruchendur (SETC)
 Puducherry - Sengottai (SETC)
 Puducherry - Thiruvananthapuram (SETC)

 Puducherry - Ooty (SETC)

 Puducherry - Pampa (SETC Seasonal Route)
 Puducherry - Mahe (PRTC)
 Neyveli - Karaikkal (PRTC)
 Chidambaram - Vellore (TNSTC)
 Chidambaram - Gudiyatham (TNSTC)
 Chidambaram - Thiruvannamalai (TNSTC) 
 Kumbakonam - Vellore (TNSTC)
 Cuddalore - Vridhalachalam (TNSTC)
 Cuddalore - Madurai (TNSTC)
 Cuddalore - Tiruppur (TNSTC)
 Cuddalore - Palani (TNSTC)
 Chidambaram - Tirupati (TNSTC)
 Chidambaram - Bangalore (KSRTC)
 Chidambaram - Bangalore (TNSTC)

Local transports  
 Auto rickshaws are available anytime in Vadalur. The auto rickshaw stand is called Vallalar Auto Stand.

Nearby airports 

 Tiruchirappalli International Airport (TRZ) - 157 km from Vadalur.
 Pondicherry Domestic Airport (PNY) - 63 km from Vadalur.
 Neyveli Domestic Airport (NVY) (Not in service) - 8.8 km from Vadalur.

Hospitals 
 Government Upgraded Primary Health Centre 
 Government Veterinary Hospital, Vadalur

Landmarks 
Satya Gnana Sabha is a major tourist and spiritual center in Vadalur. Vadular is also home to Iyyan Lake and the Sacred Heart Church. The NLC mines can be seen from the observation site in the Kattukollai area of Vadalur.

 The vegetable market is held near Vadalur bus stand every Saturday.
 Meat markets run daily in Raghavendra City.
 The farmers' market is open daily in Raghavendra City.
 The cattle and goat market is held every Saturday on the grounds of Abatharanapuram.
 Sathya Ganana Sabai

Areas in Vadalur 
 Abatharanapuram
 Baktha nagar
 Serakuppam
 Parvathipuram
 Pudhunagar
 Kattukollai
 Kottakarai
 Poosalikuppam
 Vengattankuppam
 Neththanankuppam
 Ragavendra City
 Jayapriya Nagar
 NLC Officers Nagar
 R.C. Colony
 Thomaiyar Nagar

Education

Schools 
 Tripuraneni Vidyalaya Matriculation School
 Vallalar Gurukulam Higher Secondary School
 Government Higher Secondary School, Pudhunagar
 Government Girls Higher Secondary School
 S.D. Eaden Higher Secondary School
 Fathima Matriculation Higher Secondary School
 St. John School
 St. Mary's Matriculation School
 John Bosco Matriculation School
 Thambusamy Matriculation School

Colleges 
 Government Arts and Science College,DIET campus,Vadalur.
 DIET - District Institute of Education and Training, Vadalur
 Aries College of Arts and Science for Women, Karunguzhi, Vadalur
 Aries Polytechnic College, Karunguzhi, Vadalur
 OPR Institutions - Vallalar Arts and Science College for Women, Vadalur
 OPR Memorial College of Education, Vadalur

Adjacent communities

Notable people
O. P. Ramaswamy Reddiyar, former chief minister of Tamil Nadu

See also
 Satyagnana Sabha, Vadalur
 Ramalinga Swamigal

References

Cities and towns in Cuddalore district